Isti Bolagh (also Romanized as Īstī Bolāgh; also known as Ishī Bolagh and Islī Bulāq) is a village in Mehraban-e Olya Rural District, Shirin Su District, Kabudarahang County, Hamadan Province, Iran. At the 2006 census, its population was 284, in 52 families.

References 

Populated places in Kabudarahang County